Emiliano Saguier (unknown – unknown), was a Paraguayan chess player, three-times Paraguayan Chess Championship winner (1967, 1968, 1969).

Biography
In the 1960s Emiliano Saguier was one of Paraguay's leading chess players. He three times in row won Paraguayan Chess Championships: 1967, 1968, and 1969. Emiliano Saguier was participant of a number of international chess tournaments held in Latin America.

Emiliano Saguier played for Paraguay in the Chess Olympiad:
 In 1964, at second board in the 16th Chess Olympiad in Tel Aviv (+4, =8, -5).

References

External links

Emiliano Saguier chess games at 365chess.com

Year of birth missing
Year of death missing
Paraguayan chess players
Chess Olympiad competitors
20th-century chess players
20th-century Paraguayan people